The 2018 Troféu Joaquim Agostinho–GP Internacional Torres Vedras was four-stage men's road cycling stage race that took place in the Centro region of Portugal between 12 and 15 July 2018. It was the 41st edition of the Troféu Joaquim Agostinho and was rated as a 2.2 event as part of the UCI Europe Tour.

Teams 

The 20 teams invited to the race were:

Stages

Classification leadership 

 In stage two, Nicholas Schultz, who was second in the young rider classification, wore the orange jersey, because first placed José Fernandes wore the yellow jersey as leader of the general classification.
 In stage two, Nícolas Sessler, who was third in the combination classification, wore the black jersey, because first placed Tiago Ferreira wore the blue jersey as leader of the mountains classification and second placed Gotzon Udondo wore the white jersey as leader of the sprints classification.
 In stage three, Cyril Barthe, who was second in the points classification, wore the grey jersey, because first placed Óscar Hernández wore the yellow jersey as leader of the general classification.

Final standings

General classification

Points classification

Mountains classification

Sprints classification

Young rider classification

Combination classification

Team classification

References

External links 
 

Troféu Joaquim Agostinho
Troféu Joaquim Agostinho